Mohi Te Atahikoia (?–1928) was a notable New Zealand tribal leader, politician and historian. Of Māori descent, he identified with the Ngati Kahungunu iwi. He was born in Waimārama, Hawke's Bay, New Zealand.

He came second after Wi Pere.

References

1928 deaths
Māori politicians
20th-century New Zealand historians
People from Waimārama
Ngāti Kahungunu people
Year of birth missing
Unsuccessful candidates in the 1899 New Zealand general election
19th-century New Zealand politicians